Dimitri Gutas (born 1945, in Cairo) is an American Arabist and Hellenist specialized in medieval Islamic philosophy, who serves as professor emeritus of Arabic and Islamic Studies in the Department of Near Eastern Languages and Civilizations at Yale University.

Biography
Gutas studied classical philology, religion, history, Arabic and Islamic studies at Yale University, where he received his doctorate in 1974.

His main research interests are the classical Arabic and the intellectual tradition of the Middle Ages in the Islamic culture, especially Avicenna, and the Graeco-Arabica, which is the reception and the tradition of Greek works on medicine, science and philosophy in the Arab-Islamic world (especially from the 8th to the 10th century in Baghdad ). In this field he is considered one of the leading experts. He is a co-editor in Yale's Project Theophrastus. He worked with Professor Gerhard Endress of Ruhr University Bochum in Germany to create the Greek and Arabic Lexicon.

Gutas is a member of the advisory board of numerous journals, including the leading journal Arabic Sciences and Philosophy (Cambridge University Press)  and co-editor and contributors to the revision of the Ueberweg, a comprehensive history of philosophy.

In 2011, the festschrift titled Islamic philosophy, science, culture, and religion: Studies in honor of Dimitri Gutas was published by Brill Publishers with articles by friends, colleagues, and students.

Publications

Monographs
 Greek Wisdom Literature in Arabic Translation. A Study of the Graeco-Arabic Gnomologia. (New Haven 1975)
 Avicenna and the Aristotelian tradition. Introduction to Reading Avicenna's Philosophical Works. (Leiden 1988; second revised and expanded edition 2014)
 Greek Thought, Arabic Culture. The Graeco-Arabic Translation Movement in Baghdad and Early 'Abbasid Society. (2nd-4th / 8th-10th centuries) (London and New York, 1998) (translated into seven languages)
 Greek Philosophers in the Arabic Tradition (Aldershot, Ashgate 2000)
 Philosophy, Theology and Mysticism in Medieval Islam, Dimitri Gutas & Richard M. Frank (London: Routledge, 2005)
 Orientations of Avicenna's Philosophy: Essays on his Life, Method, Heritage (Aldershot, Ashgate 2014)

Books edited
 Theophrastus of Eresus. Sources for his Life, Writings, Thought and Influence. 2 volumes edited by WW Fortenbaugh, PM Huby, RW Sharples, and D. Gutas (Leiden 1992)
 Theophrastus, On First Principles (transmitted as his Metaphysics). Greek text and Medieval Arabic translation, edited and translated, with Excursus on Graeco-Arabic Editorial Technique. Leiden 2010
 (With Gerhard Endress): A Greek and Arabic Lexicon (GALEX): Materials for a Dictionary of Medieval Translations from Greek into Arabic. Brill 1992 - (Handbook of Oriental Studies, Section One: The Near and Middle East, Vol 11)
 Aristotle Poetics / editio maior of the Greek text with historical introductions and philological commentaries by Leonardo Tarán (Greek and Latin, and edition of the Greek text) and Dimitri Gutas (Arabic and Syriac). Mnemosyne, bibliotheca classica Batava. Supplementum; v. 338. Leiden; Boston: Brill, 2012.

Articles
 The Study of Arabic Philosophy in the Twentieth Century. An Essay on the Historiography of Arabic Philosophy. In: British Journal of Middle Eastern Studies 29 (2002) 5-25
 The Heritage of Avicenna: The Golden Age of Arabic Philosophy, 1000 - 1350. In: J. Janssen, D. De Smet (eds.): Avicenna and His Heritage (Leuven 2002), 81-97.

References

1945 births
American Arabists
American Islamic studies scholars
American philosophers
Hellenists
Living people
Scholars of medieval Islamic philosophy
Yale University faculty